Deep Lake is a small elongate hypersaline lake 0.5 nautical miles (0.9 km) north of Cape Barne, Ross Island. The descriptive name was applied by the British Antarctic Expedition, 1907–09.

Deep Lake's surface temperature on average ranges from -16 to 12 °C, with only a few meters at the lake's surface exceeding 0 °C for a few months of the year during the austral summer. Lake water temperatures can fall as low as -20 °C in winter, however the lake's water column is able to remain free of ice year-around due to the high salinity (~270 g/L−1) of the lake water. The archaeon Halorubrum lacusprofundi was first isolated from Deep Lake in the 1980s and is the first archaea domain member to be isolated from a cold environment.

References

Saline lakes of Antarctica